Liam Blyde (born 26 September 1997) is a New Zealand rugby union player who currently plays as a Halfback for  in New Zealand's domestic Mitre 10 Cup.

Early career
Blyde is originally from Lepperton and was schooled at New Plymouth Boys' High School where he played first XV rugby.

Senior career
Blyde plays for Clifton in the Taranaki domestic club rugby.

References 

Living people
New Zealand rugby union players
1997 births
Rugby union scrum-halves
Taranaki rugby union players